Sergiolus is a genus of ground spiders that was first described by Eugène Simon in 1892.

Species
 it contains twenty-one species:
Sergiolus angustus (Banks, 1904) – North America
Sergiolus bicolor Banks, 1900 – USA, Canada
Sergiolus capulatus (Walckenaer, 1837) (type) – USA, Canada
Sergiolus columbianus (Emerton, 1917) – USA, Canada
Sergiolus cyaneiventris Simon, 1893 – USA, Cuba
Sergiolus decoratus Kaston, 1945 – USA, Canada
Sergiolus gertschi Platnick & Shadab, 1981 – USA, Mexico
Sergiolus guadalupensis Platnick & Shadab, 1981 – Mexico
Sergiolus hosiziro (Yaginuma, 1960) – China, Korea, Japan
Sergiolus iviei Platnick & Shadab, 1981 – USA, Canada
Sergiolus kastoni Platnick & Shadab, 1981 – USA, Cuba
Sergiolus lowelli Chamberlin & Woodbury, 1929 – USA, Mexico
Sergiolus magnus (Bryant, 1948) – Hispaniola
Sergiolus mainlingensis Hu, 2001 – China
Sergiolus minutus (Banks, 1898) – USA, Cuba, Jamaica
Sergiolus montanus (Emerton, 1890) – North America
Sergiolus ocellatus (Walckenaer, 1837) – USA, Canada
Sergiolus songi Xu, 1991 – China
Sergiolus stella Chamberlin, 1922 – USA, Mexico
Sergiolus tennesseensis Chamberlin, 1922 – USA
Sergiolus unimaculatus Emerton, 1915 – USA, Canada

References

Araneomorphae genera
Gnaphosidae
Taxa named by Eugène Simon